Copitype is a genus of moths of the family Noctuidae. The genus was erected by George Hampson in 1906.

Species
Copitype pagodae (Alphéraky, 1892) Tibet
Copitype potalae Ronkay & Varga, 1998

References

Cuculliinae